MTV (originally Music Television) is a television channel in the United States and a group of affiliated channels worldwide that specialize in broadcasting music videos and other programming related to popular culture.

MTV may also refer to: 
 MTV Networks (now renamed as Paramount Media Networks), a Paramount Global subsidiary that serves as the parent company of the MTV channel
 MTV Entertainment Group, a Paramount Global subsidiary that serves as the parent company of the MTV Channels and Studios
 Any of MTV's channels, both domestic and worldwide affiliates

Music
 "MTV", a song by rock band Deep Purple from the Tour Edition of Rapture of the Deep

People
 Mark T. VandeWettering, MTV ray tracer program designer
 Martijn ten Velden (born 1972), house music DJ and producer from the Netherlands 
 Melody Trouble Vixen, a female professional wrestler from the Gorgeous Ladies of Wrestling

Television
 Magyar Televízió, Hungarian public television station
 MTV1 and mtv, former names of Hungarian television channel M1, owned by Magyar Televízió
 MTV Oy, a media company owned by Telia Company
 Mainos-TV, former name of Finnish commercial TV station MTV3
 
 Metromedia Television, former owner of television stations owned by Fox Television Stations
 Mona the Vampire, a Canadian/French animated television series
 MTV Channel, Sri Lankan media company
 MTV (Lebanon) or Murr Television, a Lebanese television station
 MTV Sports (Sri Lanka), Sri Lankan sports, entertainment, lifestyles, business and news television channel
 Mie Television, a Japanese broadcaster

Other
 AMV video format, alternative name MTV
 Blue Ridge Airport, FAA Location identifier MTV
 Magnesium/Teflon/Viton, pyrotechnic payload applied in aerial infrared decoy flares
 Medium Tactical Vehicle, U.S. Army 5-ton capacity truck
 Methylenedioxypyrovalerone, street term MTV
 Modular Tactical Vest, armor vest used by the United States Marine Corps
 Molecular tagging velocimetry, technique of measuring flow velocities
 Mota Lava Airport, Vanuatu, IATA airport code MTV
 MTV Ingolstadt, German sports club
 MTV Ray Tracer graphic file, the output format of the MTV ray tracer program by Mark T. VandeWettering

See also